This page summarises the Australia national soccer team fixtures and results in 2016.

Summary
Australia started the year by progressing to the next stage of World Cup qualification after winning the final two qualification matches. By the end of the year Australia had played five of their ten Third Round qualifiers. After winning the first two, they drew the next three leaving them third in a group of six with just one point separating the top four.

Record

Match results

Friendlies

Joint World Cup and Asian Cup qualifiers

World Cup qualifiers – Third Round

Player statistics
Correct as of 15 November 2016 (v. ).
Numbers are listed by player's number in WC&AFC Qualification or last friendly played

References

External links
 Australia: Fixtures and Results

Australia national soccer team seasons
2016 national football team results